Alvin Jackson is the Richard Lodge Professor of History at the University of Edinburgh. His work focuses on unionism in the history of the Britain and Ireland.

Works

References

Academics of the University of Edinburgh
Historians of the United Kingdom
Historians of Ireland
Year of birth missing (living people)
Living people